Highway 106 is a  2-lane limited-access highway located within Pictou County, in the Canadian province of Nova Scotia.

The provincial government named the highway the Jubilee Highway on December 21, 2012 in honour of Queen Elizabeth II's Diamond Jubilee.

Route description 
Highway 106 begins at a trumpet interchange with Highway 104.
The route bypasses to the west side of New Glasgow by running along the centre of Abercrombie Point.
It crosses Pictou Harbour to the town of Pictou using the Harvey A. Veniot Causeway, which opened in 1968.
A traffic circle at the west end of Pictou, known as the Pictou Rotary, connects Highway 106 with the centre of town as well as Trunk 6 (the Sunrise Trail) and Route 376. The route is a super two expressway except for a short section of at-grade two lane highway near the northern terminus. The route ends in Caribou at the Northumberland Ferries terminal to Prince Edward Island, where the Trans-Canada Highway designation continues as Prince Edward Island Highway 1.

Major intersections

References 

106
Nova Scotia 106
Roads in Pictou County
Limited-access roads in Canada